Magma is a genus of house flies in the family Muscidae. There is at least one described species in Magma, M. opportunum.

References

Further reading

External links

 

Muscidae
Schizophora genera